Branimir Popović (born 17 January 1967) is a Montenegrin and Serbian actor and politician. He appeared in more than twenty films since 1992. From 2000 to 2003, he served as Minister of Culture in the Government of Montenegro.

Selected filmography

References

External links 

1967 births
Living people
Actors from Podgorica
20th-century Montenegrin male actors
21st-century Montenegrin male actors
Government ministers of Montenegro
Politicians from Podgorica
Montenegrin actor-politicians
Zoran Radmilović Award winners